Daedunsan is a mountain of Chungcheongnam-do, western South Korea. It has an elevation of 878 metres. Daedunsan has a thousand stone rods extending for 6 km. Daedun Mountain belongs to the "Old Mountain Range". The vegetation is generally 600m in height, with pine trees, oak trees, Korean plum-yew trees and so on. Above that, deciduous broad-leaved trees are dense.

See also
List of mountains of Korea

References

Mountains of South Korea
Mountains of South Chungcheong Province